Joan Albert (1943-2012) was an American artist. Her work is included in the collections of the Museum of Modern Art, New York and the Harvard Art Museums. In 2014, two  years after her death, Albert was included in a Time Magazine article about under-appreciated photographers from the Northeast United States.

Biography

Early life 
Joan M. Albert was born April 28, 1943 to Charles J. and Elinor (Allen) Mikulka.  Albert grew up in Watertown, Massachusetts.  After graduating from Mount Trinity Academy in 1960, she went on to attend St. Mary's College in Notre Dame, Indiana where she earned a Bachelors in English in 1964.  Albert later went on to earn a Masters Degree from the MFA Massachusetts College of Art in 1983.

Death 
Albert died on Thursday, July 12, 2012 from a heart attack at the age of 69.  She was laid to rest at Mount Auburn Cemetery in Cambridge, Massachusetts.

References

External links
 images of Albert's work on MoMA

1943 births
2012 deaths
20th-century American photographers
21st-century American photographers
20th-century American women photographers
21st-century American women photographers